Media release may refer to:
Anti-tromboning, a feature used in telecommunication networks that optimises the use of the access network
News release, a press release or press statement